Resurrection is the sixth studio album by the Japanese power metal/neo-classical metal band Galneryus, released on June 23, 2010. It is the first album to feature Galneryus' new singer Masatoshi "Sho" Ono and new bassist Taka, after the departure of Yama-B (vocals) and Yu-To (bass). The track "A Far-Off Distance" was used as the ending theme for the anime television series Rainbow: Nisha Rokubō no Shichinin. "Emotions" was named the 73rd best guitar instrumental by Young Guitar Magazine in 2019.

Track listing
All songs arranged by Galneryus and Yorimasa Hisatake.

Credits
Syu - Lead/rhythm guitars/backing vocals
Masatoshi Ono - Vocals
Taka - Bass
Yuhki - Keyboards
Junichi Satoh - Drums

Chart performance
The album reached number 35 on the Oricon album charts and #40 at the Billboard Japan Top Albums.

References

External links
 Official Galneryus website 

2010 albums
Galneryus albums